Perigon can refer to

In mathematics, an angle of 360° (see )
Périgon, a town in the fictional province of Averoigne in the writings of Clark Ashton Smith

See also
 Perigone (disambiguation)